Canmore is an online database of information on over 320,000 archaeological sites, monuments, and buildings in Scotland. It was begun by the Royal Commission on the Ancient and Historical Monuments of Scotland. Historic Environment Scotland has maintained it since 2015. The Canmore database is part of the National Record of the Historic Environment (or NRHE), formerly the National Monuments Record of Scotland (or NMRS) and contains around 1.3 million catalogue entries.

References

External links 
 

Archaeology of Scotland
Architecture in Scotland
 Canmore
Archives in Scotland
Databases in Scotland
Architecture databases
Archaeological databases